Juliette Jeffers is a Caribbean–American actress of St. Kitts and Nevis descent. Jeffers has appeared on several TV shows, films and TV commercials. Jeffers has also appeared in several theatre performances. including Batman and Robin in the Boogie Down where she won the BRIO award for Excellence in Acting.

Early life
Jeffers was raised in The Bronx, New York. She attended the High School of Performing Arts where she majored in drama. Jeffers received a Bachelor of Arts from Hofstra University in languages. She also studied in Spain and France and speaks fluently in both languages.

Career
Jeffers moved to Los Angeles in the early 1990s and guest-starred on several TV shows such as Fresh Prince of Bel Air, Martin, Murder She Wrote and Silk Stalkings. She also appeared on ER and Grey's Anatomy. In film, Jeffers appeared in The Surgeon, starring Malcolm McDowell and more recently played Geoffrey Owens' wife in Play the Game starring Andy Griffith and Doris Roberts. She was nominated alongside John Leguizamo and Colin Quinn for a Drama Desk Award for the Off Broadway performance of her solo show Batman and Robin in the Boogie Down. Jeffers has appeared in over 50 TV commercials.

Filmography

Films

Television

Theater
 2010 – Batman and Robin in the Boogie Down – Solo Show – Stage Left Studio – Off Broadway
 2010 – Train to 2010 – Paulina – Crossroads Theatre – New Brunswick, NJ
 2008 – Chocolate Match.com – Solo Show – Elephant Theatre Hollywood
 2005 – Ah Ha Moments; Butterscotch & Fudge – Isa – Complex Theatre – Hollywood
 2002 – What I Did for Love – Journalist – McCadden Place Theater, Hollywood
 1995 – Cementville – Lessa – Theatre Geo – Hollywood 
 1993 – High Hopes and Heavy Sweatshirts – Theatre Geo – Hollywood

Awards and honors
 2013 – The Bronx Council on the Arts – Batman and Robin in the Boogie Down – Excellence in Acting – Result – Won
 2011 – Drama Desk Award – Batman and Robin in the Boogie Down – Outstanding Solo Performance – Result – Nominated
 2006 – NAACP Theatre Award – Ah Ha Moments; Butterscotch and Fudge – Best Lead Female –Local – Result – Nominated
 2004 – NAACP Theatre Awards – Batman and Robin in the Boogie Down – Best Play – Local – Result – Nominated

Writer
 2010 – Batman and Robin in the Boogie Down
 2008 – Chocolate Match.com
 2005 – Ah Ha Moments; Legacy of Love – Complex Theatre Hollywood

References

External links
Official website

Living people
American television actresses
African-American women writers
20th-century American actresses
21st-century American actresses
African-American actresses
African-American writers
Year of birth missing (living people)
20th-century African-American women
20th-century African-American people
21st-century African-American women
21st-century African-American people